The Minister for Women in the Government of Australia is Katy Gallagher, who since 23 May 2022 has been a member of the Albanese ministry. Ministers holding the position, first introduced in 1976 during the Second Fraser ministry, have held several different titles. They have often held other portfolios, and sometimes sat in Cabinet of Australia. All but the first two office-holders have been women.

History
A women's affairs branch was established within the Department of Prime Minister and Cabinet in 1976. Prime Minister Malcolm Fraser announced he wished to "have formal machinery set up for the co-ordination of government activity in women's affairs". He appointed Tony Street as the first Minister Assisting the Prime Minister in Women’s Affairs; Street and his successor Ian Macphee are the only men to have held the post. Senator Margaret Guilfoyle, the only female minister at the time (and one of only six women in parliament), declined the position, as she was unwilling to be pigeonholed into portfolios that were considered "women's work".

Scope

In the Government of Australia, the Minister administers the portfolio through the Office for Women within the Department of the Prime Minister and Cabinet, with the budget being administered through the Department of Social Services. Currently, the Minister works with other Government Ministers to ensure that women's issues and gender equality are taken into consideration in policy and program development and implementation. The Office for Women supports the Minister in this role, and is the central source of advice for Government agencies on the impact of Government policies and programmes for Australian women.

List of ministers
The following individuals have been appointed as Minister for Women, or any of its precedent titles:

List of assistant ministers
The following individuals have been appointed as Assistant Minister for Women, or any of its precedent titles:

References

External links
 

Women
Australia
Women's rights in Australia